Galach or Gal'ach is a Yiddish word meaning priest or, sometimes, any type of Christian minister. Its etymology is the Hebrew word galach, meaning "to shave" or "shaven", a reference to the fact that rabbis traditionally wore beards.

References

Yiddish words and phrases